Tyrell Peters (born August 4, 1974) is a former American football linebacker. He played for the Baltimore Ravens from 1997 to 1999 and for the New York/New Jersey Hitmen in 2001.

References

1974 births
Living people
American football linebackers
Oklahoma Sooners football players
Baltimore Ravens players
New York/New Jersey Hitmen players